Nurkhon Kurbanova (born 12 August 1994) is an Uzbekistani Paralympic athlete specializing in throwing events. She represented Uzbekistan at the 2020 Summer Paralympics in Tokyo, Japan.

Career
Kurbanova made her international debut for Uzbekistan at the 2019 World Para Athletics Championships where she finished in fifth place in the women's shot put F54 event and sixth place in the women's javelin throw F54 event.

Kurbanova represented Uzbekistan in the women's shot put F54 event at the 2020 Summer Paralympics and won a bronze medal. She also won the silver medal in the women's javelin throw F54 event.

References

1994 births
Living people
People from Namangan
Paralympic athletes of Uzbekistan
Uzbekistani female discus throwers
Uzbekistani female javelin throwers
Uzbekistani female shot putters
Athletes (track and field) at the 2020 Summer Paralympics
Medalists at the 2020 Summer Paralympics
Paralympic medalists in athletics (track and field)
Paralympic silver medalists for Uzbekistan
Paralympic bronze medalists for Uzbekistan
21st-century Uzbekistani women